Majed Abdulla (Arabic:ماجد عبد الله) (born 22 July 2000) is an Emirati footballer. He currently plays as a defender for Al-Wahda.

Career

Al-Wahda
Majed Abdulla started his career at Al-Wahda and is a product of the Al-Wahda's youth system. On 29 March 2019, Majed Abdulla made his professional debut for Al Wahda against Emirates Club in the Pro League, replacing Hamdan Al-Kamali.

Baniyas
On 24 June 2020, he left Al-Wahda and signed with Baniyas on loan to season.

External links

References

2000 births
Living people
Emirati footballers
Al Wahda FC players
Baniyas Club players
UAE Pro League players
Association football defenders
Place of birth missing (living people)